The 1925 California Golden Bears football team was an American football team that represented the University of California, Berkeley in the Pacific Coast Conference (PCC) during the 1925 PCC football season. In its 10th and final year under head coach Andy Smith, the team compiled a 6–3 record (2–2 against PCC opponents), finished in fifth place in the PCC, and outscored its opponents by a combined total of 192 to 49.

Schedule

References

California
California Golden Bears football seasons
California Golden Bears football